Nicolas Grigsby (born December 26, 1988) is a former Canadian football running back. He was most recently a member of the Ottawa Redblacks of the Canadian Football League (CFL). He played college football at Arizona.

College career
Grigsby played college football at the University of Arizona from 2007 to 2010. During his career he rushed for 2,957 yards on 572 carries with 28 touchdowns.

In 2013, he returned to college to play college baseball at Arizona Christian University.

Professional career

NFL
Grigsby signed with the Miami Dolphins as an undrafted free agent on July 26, 2011. He also spent time on the Oakland Raiders and Tampa Bay Buccaneers practice squad.

CFL
Grigsby then signed with the BC Lions of the Canadian Football League in May 2012. He was released by the Lions in June.

After spending a year in Arizona playing baseball, Grigsby returned to football signing with the Winnipeg Blue Bombers in 2014. In his CFL debut he rushed for 122 yards on 21 carries. On October 15, 2014, he was released from the Winnipeg Blue Bombers, one week after he was demoted from starting running back. The starting running back duties were given to Paris Cotton. At the time of his release, Nic Grigsby led the CFL with 9 touchdowns and was the fourth leading rusher, rushing for 744 yards. Aside from his great opening game, Grigsby averaged only 47.9 rushing yards per game in the following 13 games with the Blue Bombers.

On October 21, 2014, Grigsby signed with the Hamilton Tiger-Cats. He played in 3 regular season games with the Ti-Cats, and both playoff games. In the regular season Grigsby totaled 146 rushing yards on 30 carries and 1 rushing touchdown. In late February the Ti-Cats and Grigsby announced a contract extension.

On July 14, 2015, Grigsby was released by the Hamilton Tiger-Cats. He was signed by the Edmonton Eskimos for the remainder of the 2015 CFL season, however he did not appear in any games. Grigsby was released by the Eskimos on May 3, 2016.

Grigsby was signed to the Ottawa Redblacks practice roster on July 4, 2016. He appeared in 5 games for the Redblacks carrying the ball 59 times for 265 yards (4.5 yards per carry) with 1 rushing touchdown. Grigsby was released August 17, 2016.

References

External links
Ottawa Redblacks bio 
Hamilton Tiger-Cats bio 
Tampa Bay Buccaneers bio
Oakland Raiders bio
Miami Dolphins bio
Arizona Wildcats bio

1988 births
Living people
American football running backs
Arizona Christian University alumni
Arizona Wildcats football players
BC Lions players
Canadian football running backs
Edmonton Elks players
Hamilton Tiger-Cats players
Las Vegas Locomotives players
Miami Dolphins players
Oakland Raiders players
Players of American football from Los Angeles
Tampa Bay Buccaneers players
Winnipeg Blue Bombers players
Players of Canadian football from Los Angeles